Roadrunner: New Light, New Machine (often abbreviated to Roadrunner and stylized in all caps) is the sixth studio album by American hip hop boy band Brockhampton. The album was released on April 9, 2021 through RCA and Question Everything, and received generally positive reviews from music critics.

Background 
During the COVID-19 pandemic, Brockhampton released songs on their YouTube channel every weekend, and would sometimes livestream on Twitch and Instagram. During these streams, Brockhampton would play unreleased music, with some songs releasing shortly after the end of some streams. The series was abruptly cancelled, and in September 2020, Brockhampton producer Romil Hemnani revealed in an interview that the album's initials were RR, leaving fans to believe that the album was titled Roadrunner. The title was later confirmed, and the album's full title, Roadrunner, New Light: New Machine, was announced shortly after the release of the lead single "Buzzcut". Brockhampton recorded three different versions of Roadrunner and chose one for the final cut of the album. Kevin Abstract revealed on Twitter that Roadrunner was the first of "[two] Brockhampton albums [to be released] in 2021", later clarifying that the upcoming albums will be Brockhampton's final releases. The second album was later delayed to 2022, though on January 14, 2022, Brockhampton announced an indefinite hiatus following their Coachella performance in April 2022. That album, The Family, was announced October 27, 2022, set for a November 17 release.

After the album was released, Abstract announced via TikTok that a deluxe edition of the album was to be released soon. The Plus Pack edition of the album was released on June 4, 2021, including four new songs.

Critical reception 

Roadrunner: New Light, New Machine was met with generally favorable reviews upon release. At Metacritic, which assigns a normalized rating out of 100 to reviews from professional publications, the release received an average score of 79, based on 13 reviews, indicating "generally favorable reviews". Aggregator AnyDecentMusic? gave the album a 7.0 out of 10, based on their assessment of the critical consensus.

Amongst the positive reviews from critics, AllMusic's Neil Z. Yeung said that the album served as a "masterful group therapy session, picking up the broken pieces of life and uplifting with cautious optimism."

In June 2021, Billboard ranked the album among the best 15 albums released by LGBTQ artists in 2021 so far.

Lyrics 
Prior to the album's release, one member of Brockhampton, Joba, commented that the lyrics of Roadrunner contains themes that are very personal to the members, including the suicide of Joba's father. Kevin Abstract noted that there would be lyrics about his sexuality on the record.

Track listing 
Credits adapted from official website.

Notes
 All tracks are stylized in all caps. For example, "Buzzcut" is stylized as "BUZZCUT".
  signifies an additional producer.
  signifies a strings producer.
 "Jeremiah (Rmx)" from the Digital Plus Pack is the same song as "Jeremiah" from the Physical edition.

Samples
 "Chain On" contains samples from "September Romance Intro", written and performed by Isaac Hayes, "C.R.E.A.M.", written by David Porter, Gary Grice, Clifford Smith, Russell Jones, Robert Diggs, Dennis Coles, Jason Hunter, Corey Woods and Lamont Hawkins, and performed by Wu-Tang Clan, and "As Long as I Have You", performed by the Charmels.
 "Windows" contains excerpts and a sample of "It's Me Who Loves You", written by Darryl Gibbs and performed by Crown Heights Affair, excerpts from "In the Struggle", written by Dominic Painter, Hasani Lateef Chapman and M. Jacobs Jr., and performed by Reborn Soldiers, and "Em3", written by Shaheel Wright and performed by Lord Apex.
 "Old News" contains excerpts from "Keep Your Faith to the Sky", written by Nathaniel Johnson and performed by Willie Scott & the Birmingham Spirituals.
 "The Light Pt. II" contains excerpts from "Hace casi 2000 años", written by Edelmiro Molinari and performed by Color Humano.

Personnel
Credits adapted from Tidal.

Brockhampton

 Kevin Abstract – vocals, creative direction
 Merlyn Wood - vocals
 Joba – vocals, programming , synthesizer , bass , vocal arrangement 
 Matt Champion - vocals
 Dom McLennon – vocals, recording engineer , programming 
 Bearface – vocals, recording engineer , mixing engineer 
 Jabari Manwa – vocals, background vocals , additional vocals 
 Romil Hemnani – recording engineer 
 Kiko Merley – programming , background vocals 
 Henock "HK" Sileshi – art direction, graphic design
 Robert Ontenient – additional vocals , web development
 Jon Nunes - day-to-day management
 Ashlan Grey – photography
 BH NGR – art direction assistance
 Ashlan Grey 
 Nick Holiday
 Weston Freas

Additional musicians

 Johan Lenox – background vocals , programming , strings 
 Imondre Goss – background vocals 
 Versus – flute , saxophone 
 Shawn Mendes – vocals 
 Ryan Beatty – vocals , background vocals 
 Baird – background vocals , guitar , programming , additional vocals 
 Christian Alexander – background vocals 
 Abhi Raju – guitar 
 Lando – background vocals 
 Odunayo Ekunboyejo – background vocals 
 Nick Velez – drums 
 Goldwash – keyboards , organ , background vocals , piano , synthesizer 
 Alex O'Connor – background vocals 
 Zuri Marley – background vocals 

Technical

 Mike Bozzi – mastering engineer
 Derek "MixedByAli" Ali – mixing engineer 
 Curtis "Sircut" Bye – mixing engineer 
 Tyler Shields – recording engineer 
 Baird – recording engineer 
 Anthony Jordan Smets – recording engineer 
 Boylife – recording engineer 
 Nick Velez – recording engineer 
 Jacob Bryant – assistant engineer

Charts

Notes

References

2021 albums
Brockhampton (band) albums
RCA Records albums